Cyclopentanedione may refer to:

 1,2-Cyclopentanedione
 1,3-Cyclopentanedione

See also
 Pentanedione